Monteforte is a surname. Notable people with the surname include:

Edoardo Monteforte (1849–1933), Italian painter
Mario Monteforte Toledo (1911–2003), Guatemalan writer, dramatist and politician

See also
Places in Italy:
Monteforte Cilento, in the province of Salerno
Monteforte d'Alpone, in the province of Verona
Monteforte Irpino, in the province of Avellino
Montfort (disambiguation)
Monforte (disambiguation)